The 2008 Presbyterian Blue Hose football team represented Presbyterian College in the 2008 NCAA Division I FCS football season. They were led by second-year head coach Bobby Bentley and played their home games at Bailey Memorial Stadium. They were a member of the Big South Conference. They finished the season 4–8, 1–4 in Big South play to finish in last place.

Schedule

Source: Schedule

References

Presbyterian
Presbyterian Blue Hose football seasons
Presbyterian Blue Hose football